WYA may refer to:
Earl Lindo or Wya, Jamaican reggae musician
Whyalla Airport in Whyalla, South Australia
Where You At (disambiguation)

See also
WYAS (disambiguation)